Dirty Sock Spring is a spring in Inyo County, California, in the United States.
A sulfur spring, the naturally occurring unpleasant odor may have been compared to smelly socks. Another explanation is that the spring was named from the fact miners washed their dirty socks there.

See also
List of rivers of California

References

Rivers of Inyo County, California
Rivers of Northern California